Baró de Viver is a station of the Barcelona Metro, in the Baró de Viver area of Sant Andreu, a northern district of Barcelona. It is operated by Transports Metropolitans de Barcelona (TMB) and served by L1 (red line). The station opened in 1983 as the line grew from its terminus in Torras i Bages towards the municipality of Santa Coloma de Gramenet. It is located under the southern side of the busy Nus de la Trinitat, next to the Besòs river bank.

Services

See also
List of Barcelona Metro stations

External links

Trenscat.com
Location at the official TMB website

Railway stations in Spain opened in 1983
Transport in Sant Andreu
Barcelona Metro line 1 stations